Gunabhadra may refer to:

 Guṇabhadra (394–468), monk of Mahayana Buddhism
 Gunabhadra (Jain monk)